Justin Tokimitsu Nozuka (born September 29, 1988) is an American singer, songwriter, and actor. His debut album, Holly, was released in 2007. He has since published three more studio albums: You I Wind Land and Sea (2010), Ulysees (2014), and Run to Waters (2018).

Life and career
Nozuka was born one of seven children to Canadian mother Holly Sedgwick and Japanese father Hiromitsu Nozuka. Sedgwick raised Nozuka and his six siblings as a single mother. He is the brother of musicians George and Henry Nozuka and actor Philip Nozuka. His mother's half-sister is actress Kyra Sedgwick and his first cousin twice removed is Edie Sedgwick.

Nozuka began to write songs at the age of twelve. The earliest of his compositions from Holly, "Supposed to Grow Old" and "I'm in Peace", were written when he was fifteen. While attending St. Andrews College, an international boarding school in Aurora, Ontario, Nozuka learned to play guitar from classmates. He then went on to the Etobicoke School of the Arts, graduating in 2007. His musical influences stem from artists such as Lauryn Hill and Marvin Gaye, among others.

With help from fellow Canadian artist Damhnait Doyle, whom he met at a songwriting workshop, Nozuka was introduced to Universal Records talent scout Allan Reid. He recorded three tracks through Universal with Bill Bell as producer, leading Universal to offer him a contract. However, he decided  to "record an album on (his) own, with (his) own freedom".

In 2007, Nozuka released his debut album, Holly,  named after his mother, who supported his chosen career in music. The album has eleven songs and includes the hidden track "If I Gave You My Life". Many of the songs deal with mature themes, such as "Save Him", which is a fictional account of a woman abused by her husband. Another track, "Down in a Cold Dirty Well", is about his perspective being stuck in a well, watching his life flash before his eyes. "Criminal" describes the story of a drunken man facing the consequences of throwing a bottle into a street "where children play with bare feet" and suffers overwhelming guilt. In February 2008, Nozuka was nominated for a Juno award in the New Artist of the Year category, following the commercial and critical success of Holly.

In 2008, Nozuka toured with Marié Digby and Eric Hutchinson. From August through November 2008, he toured the US with Gabe Dixon Band and Jay Nash as well as through parts of Europe. In the beginning of 2009, he toured the United States again, this time co-headlining with Missy Higgins and special guest Lenka.

In the summer of 2009, Nozuka began working on his second studio album while touring and playing live shows in Europe. The record, titled You I Wind Land and Sea, was released in the US on April 13, 2010, and debuted at Number 118 on the Billboard 200 Albums Chart.

On February 18, 2010, Nozuka lent his vocals alongside fifty Canadian musicians to a reworked version of K'naan's "Wavin' Flag", in support of relief efforts in Haiti, following a 7.0 magnitude earthquake. Other artists involved included K'naan himself, Nelly Furtado, Kardinal Offishall, Avril Lavigne, Lights, Drake, Fefe Dobson, Esthero, Jacob Hoggard, and Justin Bieber. The track was released on iTunes on March 12, 2010, with all proceeds going to World Vision, Free the Children, and War Child.

In November 2011, Nozuka collaborated with the Slakadeliqs on their single "Love Controls the Sun", from their debut album, The Other Side of Tomorrow.

Nozuka has performed the song "Gone" in his live shows but has yet to include it on an album. Wu-Tang Clan member RZA came across the track and decided to sample it. Joined by Kobra Khan, James Black, and Nozuka, they released the song, also titled "Gone," in October 2011 as a tribute to former Wu-Tang Clan member Ol' Dirty Bastard.

Nozuka has also had various acting roles, including an appearance on Degrassi: The Next Generation as Chuck Hosada, the fictional brother to recurring character Chester, played by Nozuka's real-life brother Philip. George Nozuka also appeared in the same episode, playing the third brother, Chad.

In April 2014, Nozuka released his third studio album, Ulysees. After spending 2010 touring, he took a break to produce the record himself, resulting in a four-year gap between releases. The album is backed by the singles "Right by You" and "Sweet Lover". In 2018, he published his fourth album, Run to Waters.

Discography

Studio albums

EPs

Singles

Guest appearances

Music videos
 "Mr. Therapy Man" (Holly, 2007)
 "Criminal" (Holly, 2007 and 2009)
 "After Tonight" (Holly, 2007)
 "Be Back Soon" (Holly, 2008)
 "Golden Train" (Holly, 2009)
 "My Heart Is Yours" (You I Wind Land and Sea, 2010)
 "Heartless" (You I Wind Land and Sea, 2010)
 "Gone" (with RZA, Kobra Khan, and James Black) (2011)
 "Love Controls the Sun" (with The Slakadeliqs, 2011)
 "Keep Breathing" (with The Slakadeliqs, 2011)
 "Right by You" (Ulysees, 2014)
 "Sweet Lover" (Ulysees, 2014)
 "By Your Side" (Chestnut Spoke to Maple, 2015)
 "All I Need" (High Tide, 2017)
 "Warm Under the Light" (Low Tide, 2018)
 "No One But You" (ft. Mahalia) (2020)
 "Summer Night o8" (2021)
 "Nova" (2021)

Notes

References

External links
 
 Justin Nozuka on Youtube
 Justion Nozuka IMDB

1988 births
Living people
American expatriate musicians in Canada
American male singers
American singers of Asian descent
American people of Canadian descent
American people of English descent
American musicians of Japanese descent
American contemporary R&B singers
Canadian male singers
Canadian contemporary R&B singers
Canadian musicians of Japanese descent
People from Queens, New York
St. Andrew's College (Aurora) alumni
Sedgwick family
Canadian soul singers
Singers from New York City
21st-century American singers
Glassnote Records artists